Quodlibet is a musical form that combines several different melodies.

Quodlibet, Quodlibets, etc. may also refer to:
 Quod Libet (software), an open-source audio player
 Quodlibet (architecture), a fanciful form of architectural trompe-l'œil
 Quodlibet (card game), a card game that combines several different contracts
 Quodlibet (journal), an academic journal of Christianity and philosophy
 Quodlibets (1618–1628), by Robert Hayman, believed to be the first English language book written in Canada

 In Scholastic philosophy, a quodlibet was a debate between students and teacher on an unprepared topic